Before the Lightning Strikes is an East German comedy film directed by Richard Groschopp. It was released in 1959.

Plot
Heinz, an ambitious reporter of the Berlin am Morgen newspaper, had made a fatal error when he prepared an article about a locomotive's factory, confusing the successful and motivated Schneider Workers' Brigade with the negligent Schindler Brigade. He also presented the tyrannical manager as a paragon of virtue. Heinz's editor, Christine, decides to send him to the factory for another mission, and this time he should mingle with workers by joining them. Heinz, who takes the new assignment with little enthusiasm, becomes a highly motivated laborer and even manages to influence the Brigades' members to stop quarrelling. He also helps the manager to reconnect with his subordinates. Heinz's second article is welcomed as brilliant.

Cast
 Christine Laszar as Christine Koch
 Horst Drinda as Heinz Engelhardt
 Johannes Arpe as Paul Jordan
 Margret Homeyer as Otti Schütz
 Traute Sense as Claudia Lindner
 Werner Dissel as Sylvio O. Schmitt
 Herwart Grosse as Argus
 Hannes Fischer as Rudi Molle
 Heinz Schröder as Bruno Brause
 Gerd Biewer as Pfefferkorn
 Rudi Schiemann as butcher
 Friedrich Richter as entomologist
 Annemarie Hase as Aunt Else
 Rolf Herricht as locomotive constructor
 Hannjo Hasse as Dr. Schwarz

Production
Before the Lightning Strikes was part of a wave of light-hearted comedies released in the late 1950s to provide entertainment for the viewers, after the DEFA Board noticed the public's negative response to the ideological films made earlier in the decade. The picture still encountered several problems, and the DEFA Commission in the Socialist Unity Party of Germany's Politburo insisted on it featuring "contemporary socialist issues." It had to be completely revised before it was approved for screening. It was the third in a series of four comedies made in collaboration between director Richard Groschopp and writers Lothar Creutz and Carl Andriessen, who also worked on Sie kannten sich alle (1958) Ware für Katalonien (1959) and Die Liebe und der Co-Pilot (1960).

Reception
The West German Catholic Film Service described the film as "combining entertainment with contemporary issues, made in a cabaret style." Dieter Reimer called it "a witty comedy."

References

External links
 
Bevor der Blitz einschlägt on DEFA Sternstunden.
Bevor der Blitz einschlägt on cinema.de.

1959 films
1959 comedy films
German comedy films
East German films
1950s German-language films
German black-and-white films
Films directed by Richard Groschopp
1950s German films